Femi Seun Ogunode (born 15 May 1991 in Ondo City) is a Nigerian-born sprint athlete who competes internationally for Qatar since 2010. His personal best of 9.91 at 100 m in 2015 made him the former holder of the Asian 100m record, which was tied by China's Su Bingtian in 2018 and surpassed in 2021 at the 2020 Summer Olympics.

Ogunode made his international debut for Qatar at the 2010 Asian Games and won a 200 metres/400 metres double. The following year he won Asian and Arab titles over 200 m as well as 100 metres/200 meter sprint titles at the 2011 Military World Games. He was a finalist in the 400 m at the 2011 World Championships in Athletics.

He won his second career double at the Asian Games in 2014, this time in the 100 m/200 m, and set an Asian record of 9.93 seconds for the former event (the second Asian man to break the 10-second barrier after fellow Qatari-Nigerian Samuel Francis). He also won bronze medals at a global level that year at the 2014 IAAF World Indoor Championships and 2014 IAAF Continental Cup.

Career
In Nigeria, Ogunode ran for University of Ibadan and qualified for the 2007 All-Africa Games and the 2008 Summer Olympics. However, the Athletics Federation of Nigeria left him off of the final rosters for both events for undisclosed reasons. Following these slights, Ogunode accepted an offer to compete internationally for Qatar.

He moved to Qatar in October 2009 and began international competition the following year. He won the 100 metres and 200 metres at the West Asian Championships and was entered into the 2010 Asian Games. At the Games in Guangzhou he took two gold medals, winning over 200 m and 400 metres with personal bests of 20.43 seconds and 45.12 seconds, respectively. This made him only the second athlete in Games history to have won both events at the same competition – Milkha Singh first achieved this at the 1958 Asian Games.

He became the Asian champion in 200 metres, at Kobe, Japan. He equalled the Championships record (20.41 s) en route to gold. He then did even better at the Military World Games in Rio de Janeiro, Brazil, when he completed a 100 metres and 200 metres double. He set new championship marks over both distances (10.07 and 20.46).

In September 2014 he won the 100 m event at the Asian Games setting a new Asian record at 9.93 s. He also won the 200 m gold at Incheon. He set a further Asian record at the 2015 Asian Athletics Championships by winning the 100 m in a time of 9.91 seconds, having already broken the championship record with a run of 9.97 seconds in the semi-finals.

On 28 May 2021, he run his seasonal best of 10.00 s at Suhaim bin Hamad Stadium, Doha, winning the 100 m race of this Diamond League meeting and obtaining the standard for the 2020 Olympic Games.

Personal life
His name Femi is a Yoruba name pronounced "F-eh-mi".  He was born in Ondo State, Nigeria. His parents are TSB Ogunode and Adesola Ogunode. He is married to Kemi Adebayo www.nadreina.com. They have three children, Nathan Ogunode, Adriel Ogunode and Reina Ogunode. His younger brother, Tosin Ogunode, is also a sprinter for Qatar. He has 7 siblings.

Ogunode's father, T S B Ogunode, was a boxer and his mother, Adesola Ogunode, was a sprinter. Before focusing on running, Ogunode boxed and played football. He was a successful youth boxer and competed in state-level championships.

International competitions

References

1991 births
Living people
People from Ondo City
Qatari male sprinters
Nigerian male sprinters
Asian Games medalists in athletics (track and field)
Athletes (track and field) at the 2010 Asian Games
Athletes (track and field) at the 2014 Asian Games
World Athletics Championships athletes for Qatar
World Athletics Indoor Championships medalists
Yoruba sportspeople
Nigerian emigrants to Qatar
Naturalised citizens of Qatar
Qatari people of Nigerian descent
Qatari people of Yoruba descent
Asian Games gold medalists for Qatar
Athletes (track and field) at the 2016 Summer Olympics
Athletes (track and field) at the 2020 Summer Olympics
Olympic athletes of Qatar
Expatriate sportspeople in Qatar
Medalists at the 2010 Asian Games
Medalists at the 2014 Asian Games